Tigran Tsitoghdzyan (Armenian: Տիգրան Ձիթողցյան) is an Armenian, New York City based painter born in 1976.

Personal life 
Tigran Tsitoghdzyan was born on October 12, 1976, in Yerevan, Armenia. He is the only child of concert pianist and a philosopher.

In 1993 Tigran entered the Fine Art Academy of Yerevan and after graduating in 1999 moved to Europe to continue his education. That year he entered Ecole Cantonale d'Art du Valais in Switzerland where he earned a bachelor's degree in 2002 and a Master of Arts in the Public Sphere (MAPS) in 2005.

Tigran arrived in New York City via JFK Airport in 2009. He still resides in the city with his son.

His 2015 painting, the Armenian Mirror, currently resides at the National Gallery of Armenia.

Career

Tigran had his first solo local and international exhibits by the age of 10. Some of his childhood paintings are in the Children’s Art Museum's collection in Yerevan, Armenia.

In 2012, the artist began a series titled Mirrors. On September 16, 2014 "Mirror V", one of Tigran's works from the "Mirrors" series, was sold at the Phillips Auction in New York, USA.

In 2018, the documentary American Mirror: Intimations of Immortality was released, directed by Arthur Balder. Tigran Tsitoghdzyan himself, as well as his paintings, were in the film.

In May 2021, Cube Art Fair, the World’s Largest Public Art Fair, featured Tigran Tsitoghdzyan's works in a billboard in Times Square as part of their initiative to highlight art that was conceived during the lockdown.

Exhibitions

Tigran's first solo exhibition was in 1986, at age 10. His works were exhibited at the Children's Art Museum, Yerevan, Armenia.

After departing from Armenia in the late 1990s, the first time Tigran returned for a solo exhibit as an adult to Yerevan, Armenia was in 2015. The show which took place at the Cafesjian Center for the Arts, exhibited six of the artist's 100 ″X 70″ Mirror paintings which included his Armenian Mirror — a portrait of an elderly Armenian woman hiding her face with her hands while grieving, which the artist painted to commemorate the 100th anniversary of the Armenian Genocide; They exhibited these along with several of his large-scale paintings from his other series titled Crowd.

In 2018, Tigran had his first solo exhibit in the city he's called home for over 12 years — New York City, the show, Tigran Tsitoghdzyan: Uncanny took place at Allouche Gallery, Downtown Manhattan and featured an array of the artists’ recent works.

In 2019, his works were shown at the Emmanuel Fremin Gallery, for his Tigran Tsi: Mirrors Reimagined exhibition. Later that same year, Tigran's works were included in the 25th anniversary of Opera Gallery’s Monaco Master’s show, a contemporary art show sponsored by Prince Albert II of Monaco.

In 2021, during Singapore Art Week, the Opera Gallery in Singapore exhibited an exclusive body of work created by the artist for this exhibit.

References

External links 
 
 Tigran Tsitoghdzyan: Mirrors
 Marie Claire - Художник нарисовал Мадонну с айфоном
 Singapore Art Week 2022 
 Opera Gallery Monaco Masters Show 2019

1976 births
Living people
20th-century American painters
Armenian painters
Armenian emigrants to the United States
21st-century American painters